Plesiotrochus is a genus of sea snails, marine gastropod mollusks in the family Plesiotrochidae.

Plesiotrochus was originally placed in the superfamily Cerithioidea but was subsequently transferred to the superfamily Campaniloidea by Healy (1993).

Description
The shell have an elongate, conical shape. Their length of rather small (between 5 mm and 10 mm, with one species up to 24 mm).  The imperforate whorls are flat to concave. The subrhomboidal aperture is smooth within and prolonged by a short siphonal canal.  The outer lip is subrostrate in the middle. The columella and the siphonal canal are twisted. The sculpture shows conspicuous ribs with varices or just spirals. The operculum is eccentric.

Distribution
The species occur in the Indo-Pacific.

Species
Species within the genus Plesiotrochus include:
 Plesiotrochus acutangulus (Yokoyama, 1924) 
 Plesiotrochus calliostomoides (Thiele, 1929)
 Plesiotrochus crinitus Thiele, 1930
 † Plesiotrochus fallax Grateloup 1832 
 Plesiotrochus fischeri E. A. Smith, 1909
 Plesiotrochus luteus (Gould, 1861)
 Plesiotrochus monachus (Crosse & Fischer, 1864) 
 Plesiotrochus pagodiformis Hedley, 1907
 Plesiotrochus paucicostatus Kilburn, 1975
 Plesiotrochus penetricinctus (Cotton, 1932)
 Plesiotrochus souverbianus Fischer, 1878 
 † Plesiotrochus stephanense Cossmann and Peyrot 1922
Species brought into synonymy
 Plesiotrochus exilis Pease, W.H., 1867: synonym of Plesiotrochus souverbianus Fischer, 1878
 Plesiotrochus nipponkaiensis Habe & Masuda, 1990: synonym of Ittibittium nipponkaiense (Habe & Masuda, 1990)
 Plesiotrochus penitricinctus [sic] : synonym of Plesiotrochus penetricinctus (Cotton, 1932)
 Plesiotrochus unicinctus Adams, A., 1853: synonym of Plesiotrochus souverbianus Fischer, 1878

References

 Houbrick R.S. 1990. Aspect of the anatomy of Plesiotrochus (Plesiotrochidae, fam. n.) and its systematic position in Cerithioidea (Prosobranchia Caenogastropoda). pp. 237–249, in: Wells F.E., Walker D.I., Kirkman H. & Letheridge R., eds., The marine fauna and flora of Albany. Volume 1. Perth, Western Australia Museum. page(s): 238

Plesiotrochidae